was a Japanese statesman and waka poet in the Nara period. He was one of the Man'yō no Go-taika, the five great poets of his time, and was part of Fujiwara no Kintō's .

Ōtomo was a member of the prestigious Ōtomo clan.
The Otomo clan was a powerful clan that flourished from the 5th to 9th centuries.

They are said to have descended from Ame-no-Oshihi-no-Mikoto, who served as a precursor to Amaterasu's grandson, Ninigi no Mikoto, and together with the Monobe clan were responsible for the military affairs of the Yamato kingdom and were also active in politics.

Genealogy
Father: Otomo Tabito
Mother: Tambirou-no-musume
Wife: Otomo Sakanoue Oiratume 
Children of unknown birth mother
Male: Otomo Naganushi

 Biography 
Ōtomo was born into the Ōtomo clan; his grandfather was Ōtomo no Yasumaro and his father was Ōtomo no Tabito. He was the nephew of Ōtomo no Sakanoue no Iratsume, who was also poet and a favorite of Prince Hozumi. When Tabito died in 731, Ōtomo became the head of the Ōtomo family.

In 738, he met Udoneri, and in 740 at the behest of Emperor Shōmu went to Dazaifu (Kyūshū) to suppress the rebellion of Fujiwara no Hirotsugu. In July of the following year, he became governor of Etchū Province, a post he lasted in until 751. By this time he was already the author of 220 waka.

Instead, he conspired with Fujiwara no Yoshitsugu, Isonokami Yakatsugu and Saeki no Imaemishi to plot the assassination of Fujiwara no Nakamaro. Afterwards Yoshitsugu took sole responsibility for the affair, but due to suspicions about Yakamochi's involvement he was transferred to the governorship of Satsuma Province.

In 777, he rose to the governorship of Ise Province.

He died in 785 by drowning in Mutsu Province while attending to his concurrent post as shōgun. Soon after his death, Fujiwara no Tanetsugu was assassinated; suspecting that Yakamochi was involved in the affair, his burial was denied and he was posthumously disgraced and excommunicated. His son was stripped of rank and forced into exile, and it was only in 806 that he regained his rank.

 Poetic works 
A theory holds that Yakamochi was the compiler (or the final compiler) of the Man'yōshū, the first poetry anthology created in Japanese history, for which he not only wrote several poems but also transcribed, rewrote, and refashioned an unknown number of ancient poems and folklore. About 481 of the poems included in the anthology were his works. He was the most prolific and prominent writer of his time, and had a great influence on the Shika Wakashū as well. The famous Gunka song Umi Yukaba used one of his most famous and outstanding poem as lyrics, and was considered Japan's second anthem during wartime. It was the anthem of the Japanese navy, serving as the send-off song for sailors at the beginning of the war in 1937. It also formed part of the Japanese military appropriation of high culture for the historical justification of its existence.

He wrote a eulogy (banka) for Prince Asaka (安積皇子 Asaka-no-miko'').

Statue of Otomo Yakamochi
In 1981, a statue of Otomo Yakamochi was installed in the station square at the north exit of JR Takaoka Station to commemorate the first Takaoka Manyo Festival. Later, when the statue was temporarily removed and repaired in conjunction with the JR Takaoka Station area development project, there were opinions to move the statue to the Fushiki district, where the Koshinokufu, Yakamochi's post, existed, but in the end it was decided to install it again at the north exit of the station as a symbol of Takaoka Station.

In addition, a statue of Otomo Yakamochi exists near the Kawauchi Historical Museum and in front of Kawauchi Station in Satsumasendai City, Kagoshima Prefecture, where he was assigned as the Satsuma provincial governor, as one of the "historical statues to tell to the future"

See also
 8th century in poetry
 Japanese poetry

References 

6.https://skima-shinshu.com/ootomoshi/
7.https://rekishigaiden.com/yakamochi/
This article is based on material from the equivalent article in the Japanese Wikipedia.

External links 

718 births
785 deaths
Date of birth unknown
8th-century Japanese poets
8th-century shōguns
Japanese male poets
Shōguns
Deaths by drowning
Man'yō poets
Hyakunin Isshu poets
Deified Japanese people